This article collates key records and statistics relating to Leicester Tigers, including information on honours, player appearances, points and tries, matches, sequences, internationals, season records, opponents and attendances.

Honours 
Tigers first silverware was the Midlands Counties Cup, Tigers entered this competition from 1881 to 1914.  There were then no competitions until 1971 when the RFU Knockout Cup started.  Tigers won this for the first time in 1979, the competition continued until 2005 when it was replaced by the Anglo-Welsh Cup which Tigers have won three times, a record since the re-launch and addition of Welsh sides.  The league started in 1987 and Tigers were the inaugural champions of England, a play off for the title was introduced in 2003. Leicester hold the record for most Premiership titles (11), the most consecutive Premiership Final appearances (9) and the most Play off appearances (14).  On 18 May 2008 against Gloucester at Kingsholm they were the first team to achieve an away semi-final victory in the Premiership play-offs. They were the first side to retain the Heineken Cup after winning the competition in 2001 and 2002.

1st XV
 Premiership
 Champions (11): 1988, 1995, 1999, 2000, 2001, 2002, 2007, 2009, 2010, 2013, 2022
 Runners-up (7): 1994, 1996, 2005, 2006, 2008, 2011, 2012
 European Cup
 Champions (2): 2001, 2002
 Runners-up (3): 1997, 2007, 2009
 RFU Knockout Cup
 Champions (5): 1979, 1980, 1981, 1993, 1997
 Runners-up (5): 1978, 1983, 1989, 1994, 1996
 Anglo-Welsh Cup
 Champions (3): 2007, 2012, 2017
 Runners-up (1): 2008
European Challenge Cup
 Runners-up (1) 2020-21
 Midland Counties Cup
 Champions (12) 1898, 1899, 1900, 1901, 1902, 1903, 1904, 1905, 1909, 1910, 1912, 1913
 Runners-up (3) 1889, 1891, 1894

Leicester A
Leicestershire County Cup
 Champions (5) 1895, 1896, 1898, 1899, 1902
Premiership A League
 Champions (4) 2005, 2006, 2010, 2011
 Runners-up (1) 2007

Player records

Appearances

Most appearances
 All-time most appearances 
Current players in bold. 

 Most appearances: 502 – David Matthews (29 April 1955 – 23 August 1974)
 Most league appearances: 234 – Graham Rowntree (12 January 1991 – 27 May 2006)
 Most cup appearances: 51 – Paul Dodge (14 November 1975 – 26 January 1991)
 Most European appearances: 75 – Ben Youngs (17 November 2007 – 21 May 2021)
 Most appearances in a single season: 45 – Teddy Haselmere in 1922/23
 Most successive appearances: 109 – David Matthews (14 January 1961 – 7 December 1963)
 Most appearances in cup finals: 13 – Geordan Murphy
 Most appearances as captain:

Youngest and oldest appearances
 Longest spell at club: 27 years 169 days – Graham Willars (17 October 1959 – 4 April 1987)
 Youngest first-team player: 16 years 52 days – Martinus Swain (v Harlequins, 28 December 1895)
 Youngest player in competitive game: 16 years 237 days – George Ford (v Leeds in Anglo-Welsh Cup, 8 November 2009)
 Oldest first-team player: 47 years 135 days – Graham Willars (v Waterloo RFC, 4 April 1987)
 Oldest player in competitive game: 40 years 109 days – Brad Thorn (v Bath in Premiership Rugby, 23 May 2015)
 Oldest debutant: 39 years 243 days – Brad Thorn (v Gloucester, 4 October 2014)

Try and points scorers

Top try scorers
 Top 10 all-time top tryscorers  Current players in bold.

 Most tries: 206 – Percy Lawrie
 Most league tries: 75 – Neil Back
 Most cup tries: 31 – Harry Wilkinson
 Most European tries: 25 – Geordan Murphy
 Most tries in a game by a player: 7 – Alastair Smallwood (versus Manchester R.F.C. on 30 December 1922)
 Most tries scored in a single season: 59 – Teddy Haselmere in 1919–20
 Most tries scored in a season of Premiership Rugby or National League Division 1: 16 – Neil Back (1998–99)
 Most tries scored in a calendar year: 46 – Teddy Haselmere in 1920
 Most tries scored on debut: 3 – 7 players, most recently Marika Vunibaka (versus Loughborough Students, on 14 November 1997)

Other try-scoring records
 Most consecutive games with a try scored: 8 – Percy Lawrie (19 November 1911 – 28 December 1911)
 Most hat-tricks (or better): 17 – Teddy Haselmere
 Youngest try-scorer: 17 years, 1 month – Charles Wynne (v Birkenhead, 26 December 1913)
 Youngest try-scorer in a competitive match: 18 years, 89 days – Ollie Smith (v Gloucester in 2000–01 Tetley's Bitter Cup, 11 November 2000)
 Oldest try-scorer: 42 years + – Jesse Ball (v Wortley, 4 April 1896)
 Oldest try-scorer in a competitive match: 39 years, 307 days – Brad Thorn (v Toulon in 2014–15 Champions Cup, 7 December 2014) 
 Quickest try: 14 seconds – John Duggan (v Moseley, 22 April 1978)
 Quickest hat-trick: 8 minutes – Peter Sandford (v Nuneaton, 20 February 1993)

Top points scorers

Note: Points recorded at contemporary values. See History of rugby union#Method of scoring and points for history of how points values have changed.

 Top 10 all-time points scorers Current players in bold.

 Most points: 4,507 – Dusty Hare
 Most league points: 1,180 – Tim Stimpson
 Most cup points: 531 – Dusty Hare
 Most European points: 406 – Andy Goode
 Most points in a game by a player: 43 – Dusty Hare (v Birmingham on 17 September 1986
 Most points in a Premiership Rugby game: 32 – Tim Stimpson (v Newcastle on 21 September 2001)
 Most points scored in a single season: 486 (9t, 57c, 109p) – Tim Stimpson in 2000–01
 Most points scored in a season of Premiership Rugby or National League Division 1: 321 – Tim Stimpson (1999–2000)
 Most points scored in a calendar year: 451 – Tim Stimpson in 2001
 Most points scored on debut: 27 – Rob Liley (v Boroughmuir on 25 August 1996)

Other point-scoring records
 Youngest points scorer: 16 years, 237 days – George Ford (v Leeds, Anglo-Welsh Cup, 8 November 2009)
 Oldest points scorer: 46 years + – Jesse Ball (v Belgrave St Peters, 11 March 1899)
 Oldest points scorer in a competitive match: 39 years, 307 days – Brad Thorn (v Toulon, 2014–15 Champions Cup, 7 December 2014) 
 Quickest points scorer: 12 seconds – Jez Harris (drop goal, v Northampton, 1993–94 Courage League, 8 January 1994)
 Most times scoring all of Leicester's points: 41 games – Dusty Hare
 Most successive points scoring games: 118 games – Dusty Hare (17 December 1983 – 4 August 1987)

Internationals
Italics denotes also national record.

 Most international caps won while at Leicester: 124 – Ben Youngs (115 , 2 Lions) 
 Most  international caps won while at Leicester: 122 – Ben Youngs
 Most  international caps won while at Leicester: 16 – Jim Hamilton
 Most  international caps won while at Leicester: 9 – Tommy Reffell
 Most  international caps won while at Leicester: 72 – Geordan Murphy
 Most British and Irish Lions international caps won while at Leicester: 8 – Martin Johnson
 Most international caps won while at Leicester for a non-British or Irish nation: 63 – Martin Castrogiovanni for 

Awards

World Rugby Hall of Fame

The following people associated with club have been inducted into the World Rugby Hall of Fame.

 Tony O'Reilly – inducted in 2009
 Martin Johnson – inducted in 2011
 Clive Woodward – inducted in 2011
 Bob Dwyer – inducted in 2011
 Waisale Serevi – inducted in 2013
 Wavell Wakefield – inducted in 2015

World Rugby Junior Player of the Year

 George Ford – 2011

Premiership Rugby Awards

The following players and coaches have received awards at the end of the Premiership Rugby season, or its predecessor.

Player of the Season
 Martin Johnson – 1996–97, 1998–99
 Neil Back – 1997–98
 Austin Healey – 1999–2000
 Pat Howard – 2000–01
 Martin Corry – 2004–05
 Martin Castrogiovanni – 2006–07
 Tom Youngs – 2012–13

Discovery of the Season
Awarded to those players under 23 years old
  Lewis Moody – 2001–02
 Ollie Smith – 2004–05
 Tom Varndell – 2005–06
 Ben Youngs – 2009–10
 Manu Tuilagi – 2010–11
 Ellis Genge – 2016–17

Director of Rugby of the Season
 Dean Richards – 2000–01
 John Wells – 2004–05
 Pat Howard – 2006–07
 Richard Cockerill – 2008–09
 Steve Borthwick — 2021–22

Rugby Players' Association Awards
Players' Player of the Season
 Neil Back – 1998–99
 Martin Corry – 2004–05
 Thomas Waldrom – 2010–11
 Vereniki Goneva – 2013–14
 Telusa Veainu – 2017–18

Players' Young Player of the Season
 Harry Ellis – 2004–05
 Tom Varndell – 2005–06
 Ben Youngs – 2009–10
 Manu Tuilagi – 2010–11
 Freddie Steward – 2021–22

Team records

Matches

 First match: Leicester 0–0 Moseley, Belgrave Road Cycle and Cricket Ground, 28 October 1880
 First competitive match: Edgbaston Crusaders 1 goal, 2 tries to 0 Leicester, Edgbaston, 22 October 1881 in the Midlands Counties Cup
 First RFU Knock-out Cup match: Nottingham 10–3 Leicester, Ireland Avenue, 21 November 1971
 First Courage League match: Leicester 24–13 Bath, Welford Road, 12 September 1987
 First European Cup match: Leinster 10–27 Leicester, Donnybrook, 16 October 1996

Record wins
 Biggest win: 100–0 (v Liverpool St Helens, 11 April 1992)
 Biggest league win: 83–10 (v Newcastle, 19 February 2005)
 Biggest cup win: 76–0 (v Exeter, 1992–93 Pilkington Cup quarter-final, 27 February 1993)
 Biggest European Cup win: 90–19 (v Glasgow, 1997–98 Heineken Cup quarter-final play off, 1 November 1997)

Record defeats
 Biggest defeat: 10–85 (v Barbarians, 4 June 2000)
 Biggest league defeat: 0–45 (v Bath, 20 September 2014)
 Biggest cup defeat: 7–47 (v London Irish, 1999–2000 Tetley's Bitter Cup Round 5, 29 January 2000)
 Biggest European Cup defeat: 0–43 (v Glasgow, 2016–17 European Rugby Champions Cup pool stage, 21 January 2017)

Other match records
 Highest scoring draw: 41–41 (v Gloucester, 2010–11 Premiership, 16 April 2011)
 Highest scoring European Cup draw: 32–32 (v Ospreys, 2009–10 Heineken Cup pool stage, 11 October 2009)
 Highest scoring cup draw: 28-28 (v Sale, 2003-04 Powergen Cup round 6, 15 November 2003, lost 28-43 in extra time)

High scores and bonus points
 Most points scored
 In a win: 100 (v Liverpool St Helens, 11 April 1992)
 In a defeat: 42 (v Barbarians, 17 March 2006)
 Most points conceded 
 In a win: 37 ( v West Hartlepool, 1998–99 Premiership, 16 May 1999)
 In a defeat: 85 (v Barbarians, 4 June 2000)
 Highest combined points: 109 (72–37 win v West Hartlepool, 1998–99 Premiership, 16 May 1999; and 90–19 v Glasgow in 1997–98 Heineken Cup quarter-final play off, 1 November 1997)
 Most tries scored: 19 (v Bedford, 15 February 1919 and v Liverpool St Helens, 11 April 1992)
 Most tries conceded: 13 (v Barbarians, 4 June 2000)
 Quickest bonus point try scored: 21 minutes by Andy Goode (v Rotherham Titans, Welford Road, 1 May 2004)

Sequences
Longest unbeaten run
 Overall: 22 (all wins, 17 November 1995 to 17 April 1996)
 Home: 42 (all wins, 22 January 2000 to 15 May 2002)
 Away: 10 (all wins, 17 February 1995 to 11 November 1995)
Longest losing run 
 Overall: 9 (27 September 1947 to 15 November 1947)
 Home: 6 (28 January 1937 to 6 March 1937)
 Away: 13 (27 October 1926 to 16 April 1927) and (3 October 1970 to 10 April 1971)
Longest winless run
 Overall: 13 (6 October 1888 to 22 December 1888)
 Home: 7 (24 December 1892 to 11 February 1893)
 Away: 15 (14 January 1928 to 8 December 1928)

Individual Seasons
 Most games played in a season: 46 (in 1923–24, 1966–67, 1972–73 and 1996–97)
 Most wins in a season: 35 (in 46 games, 1996–97 season)
 Most league wins in a season: 22 (in 26 games, 1998–99 season)
 Fewest wins in a season: 5 (in 27 games, 1889–90 season)
 Fewest league wins in a season: 7 (in 22 games, 2018–19 season) 
 Most defeats in a season: 24 (in 32 games, 2018–19 season)
 Most league defeats in a season: 15 (in 22 games, 2018–19 season)

Opponents and Familiarity
All stats correct up to 5 March 2023
 Club played most often: 251 v Northampton Saints (won 141, drawn 19, lost 91)
 Club played most often in the league: 69 v Bath
 Club played most often in domestic cup: 15 v Bath
 Club played most often in European Cup: 12 v Leinster
 Non-home ground Leicester have played on most often: 120 at Franklin's Gardens, Northampton
 Player who has played the most games against one opponent for Leicester: 31 by Sid Penny against Coventry
 Player who has played the most games against Leicester: 38 by Simon Shaw for Bristol, Wasps and Barbarians

Home attendances
Note: Records relate to Welford Road unless otherwise stated
 Highest home attendance: 35,000 v the All Blacks on 4 October 1924
 Highest home league attendance: 25,849 (first occasion v Northampton Saints, 9 January 2016)
 Highest home European Cup attendance: 32,500 v Bath (at Walkers Stadium, 2005–06 Heineken Cup quarter-final, 1 April 2006)
 Highest home cup attendance: 25,849 v Northampton Saints (2016–17 Anglo-Welsh Cup pool stage, 28 January 2017)
 Highest average attendance for a league season: 22,889 (2016–17 Premiership)

Notes and references

Records and statistics
Sport in Leicester
Rugby union-related lists
Leicester-related lists